Mose Chhal Kiye Jaaye is an Indian romance thriller television serial produced by Sumeet Mittal and Shashi Mittal under Shashi Sumeet Productions and stars Vidhi Pandya and Vijayendra Kumeria. The show premiered between 7 February 2022 to 5 August 2022 on Sony Entertainment Television and digitally streams on SonyLIV.

Premise

It is the story of a girl named Saumya who dreams of becoming a writer and wants to work even after marriage. But her marriage is fixed with Armaan Oberoi, a famous TV producer who promises her to make a career but the reality hits different.

Plot 
The show revolves around the story of a young passionate aspiring writer – Saumya Verma, who hails from a small city with big dream. Dreams to one day pen down stories for the ever-evolving Television industry but later Saumya marries Armaan Oberoi, a famous TV Producer who pretends himself a supporter of Women Empowerment but in reality he was against of it. After marrying Saumya, Armaan makes her emotional and makes her do all his work and deceives her, but Saumya does not stop, once her story is selected for a TV show, knowing that Armaan gets irritated and makes her emotional again, the author of his story himself. Later on, there was a dispute between the two on this matter, on which Armaan tried to raise his hand on Saumya, after which Saumya stopped his hand and started leaving the house, when Armaan's mother Sushma fell from the ladder, due to which Saumya couldn't leave. After few days, Saumya becomes pregnant and Armaan apologizes to her and makes her happy again. But Prisha, Saumya's maternal cousin who wanted to marry Armaan but couldn't because of Saumya, once again tries to get Armaan for which she meets Armaan everyday on the pretext of a job in Armaan's company and tries to lure him to her side. Saumya gets betrayed by Armaan and Prisha. Later she gives birth to twins, Jashan and Jahaan, but Armaan takes them away and forbids Soumya from seeing them. Through various methods, she is able to give her milk for the kids. Armaan and Soumya fight a custody battle where Armaan and his father forge Soumya's medical reports, stating she is harmful to the kids. The custody is given to Armaan and Soumya is sent to a mental health centre and cannot meet her kids until she's better.

5 Years Later
Soumya is released from the mental ward and vows to get her children back. After meeting them, she learns they don't know her and consider Prisha as their mother. Prisha, feeling insecure, brainwashes the kids against Soumya with Armaan's help. Armaan, on the other hand, learns that he needs Soumya's novel's rights to retain his public image and get out of debt. Soumya plays with his mind and does the same things to him that he previously did to her. Prisha is angry at Armaan being close to Soumya for his work but is soon told to leave the house after she realizes his true colours. Later, Armaan hides his sons to blackmail Soumya and take over her money but later all know his intentions & he goes to jail. Soumya asks Goldie to bail him out for the sake of their kids. During a heated argument between Soumya and Armaan, the kids learn the truth of everything and broke their relations with Armaan. Soumya leaves Oberoi House with her sons to an unknown place & lived happily.

Cast

Main 

 Vidhi Pandya as Saumya Verma (formerly Oberoi) – Malini and Girish's elder daughter; Shilpi's elder sister; Preesha's cousin; Armaan's former wife; Jashn and Jahan's mother. (2022)
 Vijayendra Kumeria as Armaan Oberoi – Sushma and Harsh's son; Kashish and Mahi's brother; Saumya's former husband; Preesha's former love interest; Jashn and Jahan's father. (2022)

Recurring 

 Mandeep Kumar Azad as Girish Verma – Malini's husband; Saumya and Shilpi's father, Jashn and Jahan's grandfather. (2022)
 Gunn Kansara as Malini Verma – Saumya and Shilpi's mother, Jashn and Jahan's grandmother. (2022)
 Aishani Yadav as Shilpi Verma – Malini's younger daughter; Saumya's sister; Preesha's cousin. (2022)
 Garima Parihar / Avantika Hundal as Prisha – Saumya and Shilpi's cousin; Armaan's former girlfriend and mistress; Jashan and Jahaan namesake mother. (2022)
 Alka Kaushal as Sushma Oberoi – Harsh's wife; Armaan, Kashish and Mahi's mother; Prince, Jashn and Jahan's grandmother. (2022)
 Manek Bedi as Dr. Harshvardhan Oberoi (Harsh) – Sushma's husband; Armaan, Kashish and Mahi's father; Prince, Jashn and Jahan's grandfather. (2022)
 Manasi Sengupta as Tara Oberoi – Prince's mother. (2022)
 Ritu Chauhan as Kashish Oberoi – Sushma and Harsh's elder daughter; Armaan and Mahi's sister; Amreek's wife. (2022)
 Achherr Bhaardwaj as Amreek – Kashish's husband. (2022)
 Sarwar Ahuja as Goldie Seghal – A lawyer; Armaan's childhood friend (2022)
 Simran Upadhyay as Mahi Oberoi – Sushma and Harsh's younger daughter; Armaan and Kashish's sister. (2022)
 Pashva Bhanushali as Prince Oberoi – Tara's son. (2022)
 Nirbhay Thakur as Jashn Oberoi – Saumya and Armaan's elder son; Jahaan's twin elder brother (2022)
 Alish Nathani as Jahan Oberoi – Saumya and Armaan's younger son; Jashna's younger brother (2022)
 Khushbu Thakkar as Simmi – Armaan's personal assistant. (2022)
 Radhika Vidyasagar as Saumya and Shilpi's aunt. (2022)
 Vishal Gandhi as Vihaan – Saumya’s former fiancé. (2022)
 Tasneem Khan as Shaila – Armaan’s former fiancée. (2022)
 Massheuddin Qureshi as Prisha's father (2022)
Niti Kaushik as Mystery girl (2022)

See also  
 List of programs broadcast by Sony Entertainment Television

References

External links 
 
 Mose Chhal Kiye Jaaye on SonyLIV
 Mose Chhal Kiye Jaaye on MX Player
 Mose Chhal Kiye Jaaye on Sony Entertainment Television

Sony Entertainment Television original programming
Hindi-language television shows
Indian television soap operas
2022 Indian television series debuts
Indian drama television series